was the founder of the Takeda-no-miya collateral branch of the Japanese Imperial Family.

Biography 
Prince Tsunehisa Takeda was the eldest son of Prince Kitashirakawa Yoshihisa and thus the brother of Prince Kitashirakawa Naruhisa. He was born in Kyoto in 1882. In 1902, he served in the House of Peers, and on November 30, 1903 graduated from the 15th class of the Imperial Japanese Army Academy. Due to his status, he was awarded the rank of major general in the Guards Cavalry Regiment and served with distinction in the Russo-Japanese War. It is commonly stated that he was standing next to Lieutenant Yoshinaga Nanbu, the 42nd chieftain of the Nanbu clan, during the Battle of Mukden when the latter was hit by a Russian bullet and died in combat; however, this incident occurred on March 4, 1905, after Prince Tsunehisa had been recalled to Japan.

In 1906, he was authorized to take the name of "Takeda" and to start a branch house of the imperial family in March 1906,. He was wed to Emperor Meiji's sixth daughter Masako, Princess Tsune on April 30, 1908. He continued to pursue a military career, graduating from the 22nd class of the Army War College in 1910. He returned to the House of Peers in 1919. However, in April of the same year, he died during the worldwide epidemic of the Spanish influenza. Due to his death, the coming-of-age ceremony for his nephew-in-law, Prince Hirohito had to be postponed by one year to 1920.

Decorations
 1903 –  Order of the Rising Sun with Paulownia Flowers
 1906 –  Order of the Golden Kite, 5th class 
 1913 –  Grand Cordon of the Order of the Chrysanthemum

Family 
Prince Tsunehisa Takeda had a son and a daughter:
  (1909–1992)
 , (1913–2003), married Count Sano Tsunemitsu.

Ancestry

References 

 
 
 Nihon Gaiji Kyōkai. (1943). The Japan Year Book. Tokyo: Foreign Affairs Association of Japan. OCLC 1782308

External links

1882 births
1919 deaths
Japanese princes
Japanese generals
Japanese military personnel of the Russo-Japanese War
People of Meiji-period Japan
Takeda-no-miya
People from Kyoto
Deaths from Spanish flu
Infectious disease deaths in Japan
Members of the House of Peers (Japan)
Recipients of the Order of the Golden Kite
Recipients of the Order of the Rising Sun with Paulownia Flowers